William Polk is the name of:

William Polk (colonel) (1758–1834), American Revolutionary War officer, bank president, namesake of Polk County, North Carolina
William Hawkins Polk (1815–1862), Tennessee congressman
William R. Polk (born 1929), foreign policy consultant, author
William M. Polk (born 1936), American politician in the state of Washington
William Mecklenburg Polk (1844–1918), American physician